Coenodomus trichasema is a species of snout moth in the genus Coenodomus. It is known from Sri Lanka.

References

Moths described in 1916
Epipaschiinae